Facsimile Productions is an independent London based theatre production company who stage productions of new writing by their own resident writers as well as others. They also produce tours for the British Touring Shakespeare Company.
The company was founded in 2002 by Andrew Hobbs who was previously Associate Producer at the British Touring Shakespeare Company.

Current Productions
The Woods are Lovely (2011) by Stephen Middleton

Past Productions
A Season Before The Tragedy of Macbeth (2010) by Gloria Carreño, Camden People's Theatre
Bacchus In Rehab (2009) by Andrew Hobbs and S P Howarth, Etcetera Theatre
Rasputin Rocks! (2008) by Andrew Hobbs and Alistair Smith (Henley Festival)
A Midsummer Night’s Dream (2008) UK Tour with British Touring Shakespeare
The Comedy of Errors (2007) UK Tour with British Touring Shakespeare
Romeo and Juliet (2006) UK Tour with British Touring Shakespeare
The Tempest (2005) UK Tour with British Touring Shakespeare
The Taming of the Shrew (2004) UK Tour with British Touring Shakespeare
A Midsummer Night’s Dream (2003) UK Tour and London season
The Two Gentlemen of Verona (2003) UK Tour and London season

Other projects

Facsimile Publications will shortly be publishing Stephen Howarth’s poetry collection The Unprintable S P Howarth. Facsimile Records have a roster that includes Country Al and his Lonesome Guitar and the Scarecrow Project.

Personnel

Holly Berry – Associate Performer
Una Buckley – Associate Director
Emma Burn – Associate Performer
Lucyelle Cliffe – Associate Producer and Casting Director
Andrew Hobbs – Executive Producer, Artistic Director and Resident Writer
Stephen Howarth – Resident Writer and Associate Producer
Robert Paul – Associate Performer
Anton Shelupanov – Executive Producer and Associate Performer
Alistair Smith – Resident Composer

References

Theatre production companies